Chili pepper water is a condiment that is very popular in Hawaii and in its most basic form is prepared from red chili peppers, salt, and water.

Chili pepper water is historically a homemade concoction used in household kitchens and restaurants. Traditionally the Hawaiian chili pepper (Hawaiian: nioi) is used, but others may be substituted.

References

Chili sauce and paste
Hawaiian condiments